Rafael William Struick (born 27 March 2003) is a Dutch-Indonesian professional footballer who plays as a forward for Eerste Divisie club ADO Den Haag. Born in the Netherlands, he is a youth international for Indonesia.

Early life
Struick played in the youth of RKAVV in and then at Forum Sport, before joining the academy at ADO Den Haag. He is no relation to fellow footballer Pascal Struijk.

Club career
He made his Eerste Divisie debut on 6 May 2022 against FC Emmen. Following this, in June 2022, he signed his first professional contract with ADO Den Haag.

International career
On 19 November, 2022 Struick made an appearance with Indonesia U-20, and scored a goal against Slovakia U-20 in a 1-2 lost. This is possible as he is of Indonesian descent. Indonesia manager Shin Tae-yong pointed to the selection of Struick, Ivar Jenner, and Justin Hubner as foreign based players ahead of Indonesia hosting the 2023 FIFA U-20 World Cup.

Career statistics

Club

Notes

References

External links
 

2001 births
Living people
People from Leidschendam
Footballers from South Holland
Dutch footballers
Indonesian footballers
Association football defenders
ADO Den Haag players
Eerste Divisie players
Dutch people of Indonesian descent